Kegeyli District is a district of Karakalpakstan in Uzbekistan. The capital lies at the town Kegeyli.

Etymology 
The origin of Kegeyli is associated with the Kegeyli canal, which flows through the town itself and through the district of Kegeyli also. Both sides of this canal are called Kegeyli because they were surrounded by kegay trees and turquoise. This was later generalized to the town.

History 
Kegeyli district was created in 2004 by the merger of former Boʻzatov district and former Kegeyli district. This merger was effected by Resolution 598-II of the Oliy Majlis of the Republic of Uzbekistan (11 February 2004) and Resolution 225 of the Cabinet of Ministers of the Republic of Uzbekistan (11 May 2004), which abolished Boʻzatov district and created the enlarged Kegeyli district. In 2019 it lost part of its territory to the re-established Boʻzatov District.

Locations 
As of 2021 the district contains one city (Xalqobod), one town (Kegeyli) and eight rural communities (Obad, Aktuba, Janabazar, Jalpak jap, Kok Ozek, Kumshunkul, Juzim bagʻ, Iyshan kala).

Population 
Most of the population is Karakalpak, but there are also Uzbeks, Kazakhs, Tatars, Koreans, Russians and others. In average there are 62 people per km2. The urban population is 33,800 as of 2000.

Economy 
In shirkat farms, mainly cotton is cultivated. About 18,000 pieces of cattle, 18,000 sheep and 10 camels are fed in district and private farms.

References

Karakalpakstan
Districts of Uzbekistan